Sumati Suklikar (24 December 1923 - 22 February 2011), known variously using Tai or Bai honorifics as Sumatitai or Sumatibai or Tai Sukalikar, was an Indian politician. She was a leader of Bharatiya Janata Party and its precursor Bharatiya Jana Sangh, and was from Nagpur, Maharashtra. She contested elections for Maharashtra Legislative Assembly four times in 1960s and 1970s. She died on 22 February 2011 due to old age.

She had a brother-like relation with the veteran Communist Party of India leader A. B. Bardhan from Nagpur. Although they contested elections against each other. Sumatitai was like an elder sister to Bardhan. In 2018, Maharashtra state government launched a scheme named 'Sumatibai Suklikar Yojana' in Sumati-bai's memory to effect social upliftment of women in rural parts of the state.

References

Bharatiya Janata Party politicians from Maharashtra
1923 births
2011 deaths
Politicians from Nagpur
Women in Maharashtra politics
Members of the Maharashtra Legislative Assembly
Marathi politicians
20th-century Indian women politicians
20th-century Indian politicians
Bharatiya Jana Sangh politicians